Yves Landry (born 13 April 1947) is a former Canadian cyclist. He competed in the individual road race and the team time trial events at the 1968 Summer Olympics.

References

External links
 

1947 births
Living people
Canadian male cyclists
Cyclists at the 1968 Summer Olympics
Olympic cyclists of Canada
Sportspeople from Trois-Rivières